Asher Korner (7 February 1929 – 22 September 1971) was a British biochemist.

Education
Korner was educated at Trinity College, Cambridge, where he obtained his PhD in 1957.

Career and research
Korner became Director of Studies in Biochemistry at Clare College, Cambridge, where he was made a fellow in 1960 and served as a lecturer from 1960 to 1967. During this time, Korner supervised the PhD of the future Nobel laureate Tim Hunt. In 1967, Korner moved to the University of Sussex, where he became the university's first professor of biochemistry.

Awards and honours
Korner is commemorated at the University of Sussex through the Korner Travelling Fellowship Fund.

References

British biochemists
1929 births
1971 deaths
Alumni of Trinity College, Cambridge
Fellows of Clare College, Cambridge
English biochemists
Jewish scientists